Her Purchase Price is a lost 1919 silent film romance distributed by newly formed Robertson-Cole. It was directed by Howard C. Hickman and starred Bessie Barriscale.

Plot
As described in a film magazine, Sir Derek Anstruther (Roscoe) while touring Egypt meets the slave Sheka (Barriscale), who looks European. He learns that she has been reared by a native bandit since the massacre of her mother's caravan in the desert. He falls in love with her. When she is offered for sale on the slave block, he outbids the natives and George Vincent (Wheatcroft), a scion of a wealthy family. Sir Derek marries her and takes her back to England as his wife. George with the aid of Diana Vane, who had hoped to win Sir Derek's title, promote discord in the Anstruther household. Pressed for money, Sir Derek says he would trade anything for 10,000 pounds. Sheka goes to sell herself to a notorious roue who has made advances towards her, and Sir Derek learns of her intentions and follows. When he arrives they discover that the roue has cleared up the mystery of Sheka's parentage, and that she is his heir. Sheka happily returns with Sir Derek.

Cast
Bessie Barriscale as Sheka
Alan Roscoe as Sir Derek Anstruther
Joseph J. Dowling as Hamid-Al
Kathlyn Williams as Diana Vane
Stanhope Wheatcroft as George Vincent
Irene Rich as Marda
Henry Kolker as Duke of Wryden
Wedgwood Nowell
Una Trevelyn

References

External links

Lantern slide announcing coming of the film

1919 films
American silent feature films
Lost American films
Films directed by Howard C. Hickman
1910s romance films
American black-and-white films
American romance films
Film Booking Offices of America films
Films set in England
Films set in Egypt
1910s American films